Leech Lake Township is a township in Cass County, Minnesota, United States. The population was 384 at the 2000 census. This township took its name from Leech Lake.

Geography

Demographics
As of the census of 2000, there were 384 people, 155 households, and 119 families residing in the township.  The population density was 16.6 people per square mile (6.4/km2).  There were 285 housing units at an average density of 12.3/sq mi (4.7/km2).  The racial makeup of the township was 77.60% White, 21.35% Native American, 0.26% Asian, 0.52% from other races, and 0.26% from two or more races. Hispanic or Latino of any race were 1.30% of the population.

There were 155 households, out of which 25.8% had children under the age of 18 living with them, 64.5% were married couples living together, 6.5% had a female householder with no husband present, and 22.6% were non-families. 18.1% of all households were made up of individuals, and 8.4% had someone living alone who was 65 years of age or older.  The average household size was 2.48 and the average family size was 2.74.

In the township the population was spread out, with 21.9% under the age of 18, 4.7% from 18 to 24, 22.1% from 25 to 44, 35.2% from 45 to 64, and 16.1% who were 65 years of age or older.  The median age was 46 years. For every 100 females, there were 114.5 males.  For every 100 females age 18 and over, there were 106.9 males.

The median income for a household in the township was $38,125, and the median income for a family was $42,083. Males had a median income of $40,469 versus $18,375 for females. The per capita income for the township was $17,112.  About 13.3% of families and 14.4% of the population were below the poverty line, including 18.5% of those under age 18 and 24.4% of those age 65 or over.

References

Townships in Cass County, Minnesota
Brainerd, Minnesota micropolitan area
Leech Lake
Townships in Minnesota